The 1920 Birmingham–Southern Panthers football team was an American football team that represented Birmingham–Southern College as an independent during the 1920 college football season. In their second season under head coach Charles H. Brown, the team compiled a 6–3 record.

Schedule

References

Birmingham-Southern
Birmingham–Southern Panthers football seasons
Birmingham-Southern Panthers football